The Else is the twelfth studio album by rock group They Might Be Giants, released by Idlewild Records in 2007. The album was produced in part by The Dust Brothers, along with Pat Dillett and the band.

The Else was  first available for download through the iTunes Store on May 15, 2007. The CD version was released in stores on July 10, 2007, with initial runs accompanied by a full-length bonus disc of rare material, Cast Your Pod To The Wind (the title being a parody of jazz pianist Vince Guaraldi’s 1962 hit "Cast Your Fate to the Wind"). On September 11, 2007, the band released a gatefold vinyl LP of the album. Cast Your Pod was made available separately on iTunes in July, 2009.

A video, created by Mizushima Hine, for "With the Dark" was released on the band's YouTube page on June 7, 2007. Two more videos, for "The Shadow Government" and "I'm Impressed" were also later released. A full-length video for "The Mesopotamians" was released on Stereogum.com on October 2.

"Careful What You Pack" was originally written for the soundtrack of 2009 film Coraline, but it was not ultimately used in the film.

Track listing

Cast Your Pod to the Wind (bonus disc)

Personnel
They Might Be Giants
 John Flansburgh – songwriting, vocals, guitars, programming
 John Linnell – songwriting, vocals, keyboards, programming

Backing band
 Marty Beller – drums
 Dan Miller – guitar; piano on "Careful What You Pack"
 Danny Weinkauf – bass guitar

Additional musicians
 Mauro Refosco – percussion (track 9)
 Justin Meldal-Johnsen – acoustic bass guitar (9)
 Dan Levine – trombone (9, 10)
 Stan Harrison – saxophone (9, 10)
 Jim O'Connor – trumpet (9, 10)
 Lyle Workman – guitar (6, 9)
 Sharon Jones – vocals (10)

Production
 They Might Be Giants – producers (except 3, 6, 9, 10, 12)
 Patrick Dillett – producer (except 3, 6, 9, 10, 12), engineer
 The Dust Brothers – producers (2, 3, 6, 7, 9, 10, 12)
 UE Nastasi – mastering
 Yuki Takahashi – engineer
 Greg Thompson – engineer
 Jon Altschuler – engineer
 Marcel Dzama – artwork, costumes, photography

Reception 
The album reached #9 on the Billboard Top Digital Albums chart.

References

External links
 

2007 albums
They Might Be Giants albums
Albums produced by the Dust Brothers
Albums produced by Pat Dillett
Idlewild Recordings albums
Albums with cover art by Marcel Dzama